Jaan Masing (31 January 1875 Vana-Kariste Parish, Pärnu County – 21 September 1948 Tallinn) was an Estonian politician. He was a member of IV Riigikogu.

He was a member of Asutav Kogu.

References

1875 births
1948 deaths
Farmers' Assemblies politicians
Estonian People's Party politicians
Members of the Riigikogu, 1929–1932
Members of the Riiginõukogu
Government ministers of Estonia
People from Mulgi Parish
Members of the Estonian Constituent Assembly
Members of the Riigikogu, 1932–1934